Darla Jean Hood (November 8, 1931 – June 13, 1979) was an American child actress, best known as the leading lady in the Our Gang series from 1935 to 1941. She was born in Leedey, Oklahoma, the only child of music teacher Elizabeth Davner, and James Claude Hood, who worked in a bank.

Our Gang
Hood's mother introduced her to singing and dancing at an early age, taking her to lessons in Oklahoma City. Just after her third birthday she was taken to New York City, where she was seen by Joe Rivkin, a casting director for Hal Roach Studios, who arranged a screen test. She was then taken to Culver City, California, to appear in the Our Gang movies.

She played Darla in Our Gang except for her Our Gang debut in which her character's name was "Cookie". She made her debut at age four in the 1935 film Our Gang Follies of 1936 and was soon given a role in The Bohemian Girl with Laurel and Hardy. From 1935 to 1941, she continued to play in Our Gang. She is well remembered for her coquettish character, typically the love interest of Alfalfa, Butch, or (occasionally) Waldo. One of her most memorable moments was singing "I'm in the Mood for Love" in The Pinch Singer.

Hood's final appearance in an Our Gang film was 1941's Wedding Worries.

After Our Gang 
When she outgrew her role in Our Gang, Hood appeared in several other movies and attended school in Los Angeles.  While at Fairfax High School, she organized a vocal group called the Enchanters with four boys.  Shortly after graduation, the quartet was booked by producer and vaudeville star Ken Murray for his famous "Blackouts", a stage variety show.  The group remained with Murray's Blackouts during its long run in New York City and Hollywood.
 
Darla Hood then went solo with singing engagements in nightclubs and guest appearances on TV.  She was a regular on The Ken Murray Show from 1950 to 1951.  In 1955, she was a leading lady in the act of ventriloquist Edgar Bergen.  In 1957, Darla was a regular performer on The Merv Griffin Show for the American Broadcasting Network. Other credits that year include a hit record, "I Just Wanna Be Free." and a duet with Johnny Desmond in the Sam Katzman movie "Calypso Heat Wave." Between 1959 and 1962 she recorded several singles for the small Ray Note and Acama labels.
 
In January 1959, Hood released a new record, "My Quiet Village" (Ray Note Records). Joe Rivkin, who discovered her as a child, saw the cover and cast her in her final film role —her first adult role in a movie—  playing a secretary in the suspense drama The Bat with Vincent Price and Agnes Moorehead. In 2018, along with Hood's recording of "Silent Island," "My Quiet Village" was re-released by The Numero Group both on the Exotica compilation Technicolor Paradise: Rhum Rhapsodies & Other Exotic Delights and on Silent Island, a digital-download-only retrospective of Hood's vocal music.
 
Hood was a guest on such TV shows of the early 1960s as You Bet Your Life and The Jack Benny Program, where she appeared on October 30, 1962 as "Darla" in a spoof of the Our Gang comedies with Jack Benny (who appeared as Alfalfa), and The Charlotte Peters Show in St. Louis. She did singing and voice-over on TV commercials, which included Campbell's Soup and Chicken of the Sea tuna. She was also featured in The Little Rascals Christmas Special (1979) as the voice of Spanky and Porky's mother. She appeared in her own nightclub act at the Coconut Grove in Los Angeles, the Copacabana in New York, and the Sahara Hotel and Casino in Las Vegas, Nevada.

Personal life
Hood was married twice, first to singer and insurance salesman Robert W. Decker (1949–1957), then to record-company executive Jose Granson (1957–1979). She and Granson had three children. Tommy "Butch" Bond mentioned that her marriage to Granson was difficult because he used a wheelchair following a stroke.

Death
Hood was busy organizing the 1980 Little Rascals reunion for the Los Angeles chapter of The Sons of the Desert when she underwent an appendectomy at Canoga Park Hospital, Canoga Park, California. After the procedure, she died suddenly of heart failure on June 13, 1979, at age 47. An autopsy disclosed that Hood had contracted acute hepatitis from a blood transfusion given during the operation which led to her death.

The Our Gang community was stunned at Hood's unexpected death. Fellow Our Gang member Billie "Buckwheat" Thomas said "I hate to hear it. It's a shock. She was an awfully nice person, a fine woman. We got along real good as kids." Thomas died a little over a year later. 

Hood is buried at the Hollywood Forever Cemetery in Hollywood.

Filmography

References

External links

 
 
 
 
 Darla Hood at the Encyclopedia of Oklahoma History and Culture

1931 births
1979 deaths
American film actresses
American child actresses
Deaths from hepatitis
Infectious disease deaths in California
People from Dewey County, Oklahoma
Burials at Hollywood Forever Cemetery
Actresses from Oklahoma
Hal Roach Studios actors
Fairfax High School (Los Angeles) alumni
20th-century American actresses
Our Gang